Albert-Nicolas Lottin (born 29 August 2001) is a French professional footballer who plays as a midfielder for Jong FC Utrecht in the Eerste Divisie.

Professional career
On 14 December 2018, Lottin signed his first professional contract with his childhood club Bordeaux. He made his professional debut with Bordeaux in a 2–0 Ligue 1 win over Olympique de Marseille on 5 April 2019. On 1 September 2020, Lottin signed a contract till 2023 by FC Utrecht. He will starting by Jong FC Utrecht.

Personal life
Born in France, Lottin is of Cameroonian descent.

References

External links
 
 

2001 births
Living people
Footballers from Paris
Association football midfielders
French footballers
French expatriate footballers
French sportspeople of Cameroonian descent
FC Girondins de Bordeaux players
Jong FC Utrecht players
Ligue 1 players
Championnat National 2 players
Eerste Divisie players
Expatriate footballers in the Netherlands
French expatriate sportspeople in the Netherlands